Amamkele Lithemba Qamata (born 2 September 1998) is a South African actress. She is known for her roles as Buhle Ndaba in the Mzansi Magic series Gomora and Puleng Khumalo in the hit Netflix series Blood & Water.

Early life and education 
Qamata was born in the Eastern Cape village of Cala in the Sakhisizwe Local Municipality. She moved to Johannesburg with her family at the age of three.

Qamata discovered acting through a school productions and first appeared on screen in advertisements. She is an alumna of Reddam House Bedfordview; after passing her matriculation in 2016, she took a gap year. She enrolled at the University of Cape Town for a Theatre and Performance degree, but withdrew from the institution during her second year.

Career 
Aged 17, Qamata made her television acting debut as Naledi in the situation comedy My Perfect Family on SABC1.

In 2020 she was in the cast of Gomora, as the character of Buhle in the Mzansi Magic series.

Later that year she appeared in Netflix's Blood & Water.  Qamata's character, Puleng, has a sister who was abducted at birth, and Puleng is trying to prove that a successful swimmer from a private school is in fact her sister. Kutlwano Ditsele, the casting director for Blood & Water, was executive producer on Gomora and invited Qamata to audition, which she did successfully.

Qamata has also had roles in Rhythm City and Commandos: The Mission. Qamata is set to star in Matthew Leutwyler's upcoming sports film Fight Like a Girl alongside Hakeem Kae-Kazim.

Television

Accolades

References

External links
 
 Ama Qamata at TVSA

Living people
1998 births
21st-century South African actresses
People from Sakhisizwe Local Municipality
South African television actresses
University of Cape Town alumni